Stephan Kuhl (born 27 March 1968) is a German former badminton player. Kuhl competed in two events at the 1992 Summer Olympics.

References

External links
 

1968 births
Living people
German male badminton players
Olympic badminton players of Germany
Badminton players at the 1992 Summer Olympics
Place of birth missing (living people)
Sportspeople from Cologne